Canon Fodder is a 2000 AD series created by Mark Millar and Chris Weston.  It features the adventures of the eponymous character Canon Fodder, the sole survivor of the Priest Patrol, a bizarre cross between the police and the church who patrol the streets of a future London after Judgment Day has caused the dead to rise, and society to breakdown.

Publication history
Canon Fodder first appeared in 1993, with a sequel written by Nigel Long (as "Kek-W") in 1995.  A dispute between Fleetway and Mark Millar regarding ownership of the character prevented further development. Millar had stopped working for 2000 AD by the time the second series was created and objected to the series being continued in his absence. Artist Chris Weston has since said that he only agreed to illustrate the second series because he thought the character was the property of 2000 AD. 2000 ADs editor, David Bishop, shelved plans to continue the series to avoid offending Millar.

Cast
Canon Fodder: The last surviving member of the Priest Patrol; the other members were Deacon Blue, Father O'Blivion, and Cardinal Syn. He was a judge at a beauty pageant the day his comrades were horribly killed.  Canon usually tries to conduct himself in a calm authoritative manner but when annoyed can be quite sarcastic and impatient. Canon is firmly grounded in his belief in God; he is a skilled fighter and can be very insightful. Canon has no patience for sinners and issues harsh punishments to even those who confess voluntarily.
Sadie: Canon's housekeeper. Although she has feelings of love for him (as does he for her), neither have ever told each other of their feelings.

Plot

Canon Fodder
The story opens with a badly wounded Canon Fodder being confronted by Lucifer who then apparently finishes him off. It then cuts to a flashback with Dr. Watson discovering that Sherlock Holmes and Professor Moriarty have killed themselves in a suicide pact, in order to go to heaven and kill God for not appearing on Judgement Day. Fodder and Watson recruit Mycroft Holmes (who is portrayed as a psychopath similar to Hannibal Lecter), to get them to heaven before Holmes and Moriarty. However, Holmes and Moriarty were themselves too late, and discover that Lucifer has overthrown and killed God. Fodder and his comrades arrive on the scene to be confronted by Lucifer, whose demons kill Watson and Mycroft and rip off Fodder's hand. As Lucifer is about to finish Fodder off, God unexpectedly returns. He kills Lucifer and asks why he shouldn't wipe out mankind, but Fodder points out that without mankind, God will never find the answer to who created him. The story ends with Dr Watson completing his entry in the Purgatory journals as the last adventure of Sherlock Holmes.

Dark Matter

After a failed attempt at stopping a hostage crisis in a church, Canon is locked up in Bedlam asylum, being treated by Sigmund Freud. He is freed by Deacon Blue, one of the vanished members of the Priest Patrol, who reveals that the Priest Patrol (apart from Fodder, who was judging the "Miss Purity 2000" pageant) were investigating the League of Anabolic Atheists  when they were sucked into another dimension. Blue managed to escape and return to the real world, and now wants Fodder to return with him to rescue their colleagues. Freud, Fodder and Blue travel to the other dimension, which seems to be the collective unconscious, where Deacon Blue turns out to be a demon in disguise, and the rescue mission a trap. Fodder is rescued in the nick of time by a trans-dimensional airship captained by Jules Verne. Returning to the normal universe, he is briefed by Albert Einstein and Wilhelm Reich on the threat posed by the accelerating expansion of the dimension they have just come from, which it seems is composed of dark matter, and which is feeding on humanity's fears and dark desires. Reich has constructed an "Orgone Bomb" which can destroy the dark matter universe, and Fodder returns there to detonate it. After facing down his deepest fear he detonates the device expecting to die but is amazed to discover he has instead set free the Goddess who was imprisoned in the universe and who returns him to the normal universe.

Collected editions
 "Canon Fodder" (with Mark Millar, in 2000 AD #861-867, 1993, collected in Judge Dredd Megazine Supplement 4, 2008)
 "Dark Matter" (with Nigel Long writing as "Kek-W", in 2000 AD #980-987, 1995, collected in Judge Dredd Megazine Supplement 17, 2009)

Notes

References

Canon Fodder at 2000 AD online

Comics characters introduced in 1993
Comics by Mark Millar
2000 AD comic strips
2000 AD characters
Fiction about the Devil